Tatiana Sergeyevna Kurbakova (born 7 August 1986) is a Russian retired rhythmic gymnast. She won gold in the group competition at the 2004 Summer Olympics in Athens. She is a two-time (2003, 2005) World Group All-around champion and 2003 European Group All-around champion.

Detailed Olympic results

References

1986 births
Living people
Russian rhythmic gymnasts
Gymnasts at the 2004 Summer Olympics
Olympic gymnasts of Russia
Olympic gold medalists for Russia
Gymnasts from Moscow
Olympic medalists in gymnastics
Medalists at the 2004 Summer Olympics
Medalists at the Rhythmic Gymnastics World Championships
Medalists at the Rhythmic Gymnastics European Championships
21st-century Russian women